Sruthi is a 1987 Indian Malayalam film, directed by Mohan and produced by M. N. Murali and Sivan Kunnampilly. The film stars Mukesh, Thilakan, KPAC Lalitha and Nedumudi Venu in the lead roles. The film has musical score by Johnson.

Cast
Mukesh - Pradeep
Nedumudi Venu - Thampuran
Geetha
Thilakan
Sreenivasan as Varghese
KPAC Lalitha
Ravi Menon

Soundtrack
The music was composed by Johnson and the lyrics were written by Balachandran Chullikkad.

References

External links

see the film
 sruthi(malayalam film)

1987 films
1980s Malayalam-language films
Films scored by Johnson